Don Chevrier (December 29, 1937 – December 17, 2007) was a television and radio sports announcer. He was born in Toronto, Ontario.

Biography

Early life and career
He began his broadcasting career at CJCA in Edmonton, Alberta at the age of 16 covering high school sports for radio. From 1972 to 1981, he was co-host of Curling Classic, a television program on the Canadian Broadcasting Corporation (CBC) that was earlier hosted by Alex Trebek. 

In 1972, Chevrier was the ringside commentator for the World Heavyweight Championship between Joe Frazier and Ron Stander.

Toronto Blue Jays, CFL, Ottawa Senators
In 1977, he became the original television voice of the Toronto Blue Jays Major League Baseball team. He spent the next 20 years as a commentator on the Jays' television broadcast crew.  He called Nolan Ryan's seventh no-hitter when the Rangers played against the Blue Jays on May 1, 1991. Throughout the 1970s, he broadcast curling and the Canadian Football League for CBC, calling several Grey Cups as well as Briers. In the early 1980s he moved to CTV, where he remained a fixture in its sports department into the early nineties. In 1991, he called the Canada Cup hockey tournament for the network and from 1992–93 until 1997–98 he was the television voice for the NHL's Ottawa Senators for CHRO-TV, working alongside Greg Millen.

Chevrier was inducted into the Football Reporters of Canada section of the Canadian Football Hall of Fame in 2016.

Olympic Games broadcasts
Chevrier also provided television network coverage of the Olympic Games for North American audiences since 1972, working for the CBC, the American Broadcasting Company (ABC), and the CTV Television Network before moving on to NBC. More recently, he covered events at the 2004 Summer Olympics, including badminton, table tennis, and synchronized swimming for NBC, and, along with longtime partner, Don Duguid, called curling at the 2002 Winter Olympics in Salt Lake City and in the 2006 Winter Olympics in Turin for NBC.

Personal life and death
Chevrier resided in Palm Harbor, Florida until his death. He died at home on December 17, 2007, as a result of complications from an undisclosed blood disorder.

References

External links
Sports Media Canada Award: Don Chevrier
NBC Olympics page
Obituary

1937 births
2007 deaths
American horse racing announcers
Boxing commentators
Canadian Football Hall of Fame inductees
Canadian Football League announcers
Canadian horse racing announcers
Canadian radio sportscasters
Canadian television sportscasters
Curling broadcasters
Major League Baseball broadcasters
National Hockey League broadcasters
Olympic Games broadcasters
Ottawa Senators announcers
Sportspeople from Toronto
People from Palm Harbor, Florida
Toronto Blue Jays announcers
United States Football League announcers
World Hockey Association broadcasters